Requiem for a Harlequin is the second album by David Allan Coe. It was released in 1970 on SSS International Records. There are no track names; side one is named, "The Beginning" and side two, "The End".

It is a concept album in which Coe repeatedly uses the phrase "Asphalt Jungle" to describe the life he grew up in. Reoccurring themes include hard tales of life, love, relationships, the Civil Rights Movement, 60's Counter Culture ideology, and modern society. The record is entirely spoken word (self described by Coe in recent years as "The first rap album") with backing music encompassing a wide variety of genres including rock and roll, blues, folk, and gospel.

The liner notes on the back of the album cover describe how David Allan Coe and his foster father, Jack, wrote the lyrics to the album serving time in a maximum security block in an Ohio prison.

Critical reception 
Phoenix New Times called Requiem for a Harlequin a "politically charged psychedelic concept album ... a stylistic aberration [that] presaged Coe's fondness for the outré and counter-establishment."

Track listing 
All songs written by David Allan Coe

"The Beginning" (Side A) - 15:59
"The End" (Side B) - 15:40

References

David Allan Coe albums
1973 albums